R.A. the Rugged Man is an American hip hop artist based in Suffolk County, Long Island.  His discography consists of three commercial studio albums, two unreleased albums, one compilation album, numerous physical singles, and many guest appearances on other artists' tracks.

Albums
 Die, Rugged Man, Die (Nature Sounds, 2004)
 Legends Never Die (Nature Sounds, 2013)
 All My Heroes Are Dead (Nature Sounds, 2020)

Compilations
 Legendary Classics Vol. 1 (Nature Sounds, 2009)

Unreleased albums
 Night of the Bloody Apes (Jive, recorded 1992-1994)
 American Lowlife (Priority, 1999)

Singles
 1993 "Bloody Axe"
 1994 "Bloodshed Hua Hoo"
 1996 "50.000 Heads" (feat. Sadat X) / "Smithhaven Mall"
 1997 "Till My Heart Stops" (feat. Agallah) / "Flipside"  (both later released on Soundbombing)
 1999 "Stanley Kubrick" (on Soundbombing II) / "What Da Fuck"
 2000 "Rap for real" (on Assassin album Touche d'Espoir)
 2001 "Don't Wanna Fuck With" / "Even Dwarf Start Small"
 2004 "Lessons" / "How Low"
 2005 "Chains" (feat. Masta Killa & Killah Priest) / "Black And White" (feat. Timbo King)
 2005 "Give it up" (on Wu-Tang Meets the Indie Culture feat. J-Live)
 2006 "Uncommon Valor" (on Jedi Mind Tricks album Servants in Heaven, Kings in Hell)
 2007 "Renaissance 2.0" (on Hell Razah album Renaissance Child)
 2008 "3 Kings" (on Big John album The Next Step feat. Kool G Rap)
 2009 "Supah"
 2009 "Posse Cut" (feat. Hell Razah, JoJo Pellegrino, Remedy & Blaq Poet)
 2010 "3 Greats" (on Reef the Lost Cauze album Fight Music feat. Kool G Rap)
 2010 "Nosebleed" (on Vinnie Paz album Season of the Assassin)
 2010 "Mad Ammo" (on Celph Titled and Buckwild album Nineteen Ninety Now)
 2010 "Return of The Renaissance" (on Hell Razah album Heaven Razah)
 2011 "Body the Beat" (feat. Ruste Juxx & Rockness Monstah of Heltah Skeltah on album The Maticulous EP)
 2011 "Crazy Man" (on Block McCloud Crazy Man EP feat. Celph Titled)
 2011 "High Ranking" (on Timbo King album From Babylon To Timbuk2)
 2011 "Animals" (on Clementino album "I.E.N.A.")
 2012 "No Prints" (on Ruste Juxx and Kyo Itachi album "Hardbodie Hip Hop")
 2012 "Crustified Christmas" (feat. Mac Lethal
 2012 "Zig Zag Zig" (on Rampage Ep "Everyone Aint Loyal")
 2012 "Coco Mango" remix with MF Doom
 2012 "Open Relationship" with Psalm One
 2012 "Razor Gloves" (on Vinnie Paz's album God of the Serengeti)
 2013 "Thelonius King" with Blu & Tristate
 2013 "The People's Champ" (feat. Rampage / prod. Apathy)

Guest Appearances
"Break Walls Down" (WWF Aggression) (Chris Jericho Theme) (2000)
"Lose Your Mind" - (Space Jazz) (Michal Menert (ft. R.A. the Rugged Man) (2015)
"Sleeper Cell" (Digital Voodoo) (The R.O.C. ft. Redd, Whitney Peyton & R.A. the Rugged Man) (2017)
"Deal Went Bad" (Paki Dunn ft. R.A. the Rugged Man, D.V. Alias Khryst & PRAYAH) (2021)

Videos

References

R.A.
Hip hop discographies